The 2015–16 season of the 2. Bundesliga (women) was the twelfth season of Germany's second-tier women's football league. This season started on 30 August 2015.

Changes
VfL Bochum did not apply for this season's license due to financial problems, thus automatically relegating them back to the Regionalliga. SV Henstedt-Ulzburg was promoted from the Regionalliga Nord and played in the north group. Borussia Mönchengladbach was promoted from the Regionalliga West. TSV Schott Mainz was promoted from the Regionalliga Südwest. Eintracht Wetzlar was promoted from the Regionalliga Süd. Blau-Weiß Hohen Neuendorf was promoted from the Regionalliga Nordost.

North

Results

South

Results

Relegation play-offs

First leg

Second leg

Top scorers
.

References

2015-16
2